Kypros Chrysostomides (Greek: Κύπρος Χρυσοστομίδης , 5 July 1942 – 1 December 2022) was a Cypriot politician and member of the Cyprus Parliament, born in the village of Kathikas in Paphos.

Early life and education 
Chrysostomides graduated from the Paphos Gymnasium. He studied Law at the University of Athens on a scholarship granted by the Greek government. He continued his studies at the Luxembourg Law School, again on a scholarship, where he studied Comparative Law.

On a further scholarship granted by the German government, he pursued postgraduate studies at the University of Bonn where he obtained a Doctorate in Law (Ph.D.). The area of his specialisation was Business Law. Thereafter, he worked as a scientific assistant to the Professor of Private International Law at the University of Bonn and he continued his studies in England.

Career 
For four years (1969–1973) Kypros Chrysostomides worked with the European Commission of Human Rights of the Council of Europe in Strasbourg, France. He returned to Cyprus in 1973 and began practicing law in Nicosia, shortly before the Coup d'état and the Turkish Invasion in 1974.

In 1973, he was appointed a Corresponding Collaborator at the International Institute for the Unification of Private Law UNIDROIT. In 1999 Cyprus became a full member of UNIDROIT.

From 1981 until his appointment as government spokesman in 2003, he practised law from his own law firm in Nicosia. From 2003, when Tassos Papadopoulos became President of Cyprus, he was the government spokesman until 2006.

Chrysostomides left this post in 2006 in order to take part in the parliamentary elections of 2006 as a result of which he became a member of the House of Representatives (Cyprus) where he served until March 2008, when he was appointed Minister of Justice and Public Order. He resigned from this post in December 2008 in an act of dignity and assumption of political responsibility following the escape of a convict from the Cyprus Central Prison. At the time, his resignation, was widely acclaimed and praised.

In 1998 he established the movement "Epalxis Anasiggrotisis Kentrou" (’Επαλξη Ανασυγκρότησης Κέντρου): Political Grouping for the Restructure of the Centre. In 2006, he cooperated with AKEL Left-New Powers for the 2006 Cypriot legislative election. During those elections he was elected AKEL Left-New Powers member in the House of Representatives of Cyprus.

Chrysostomides always maintained an avid interest in public affairs and became politically active in the progressive and democratic centre. He has also been involved in the scientific and social life in Cyprus. He was the president of the Political Grouping for the Restructure of the Centre, which was established in 1998.

Chrysostomides was a founding member of the Consumers’ Association, a member of the Association of Sciences, of the Greek Civilization Association and of the Historic Studies Association. He was the president of the Cyprus Institute of Political Research and European Affairs, which closely cooperates with various scientific institutions of Greece and elsewhere. He was also a member of the International Association of International Law, the Greek Institute of International Law, the International Law Association as well as other International Organizations.

Chrysostomides was a member of the International Chamber of Commerce International Court of Arbitration (ICC) for two consecutive terms, until June 2018. He was a member of the ICC Commission on Arbitration and Alternative Dispute Resolution (ADR), serving his second term.

In 2020, he was awarded the Cyprus Business Leader Award by the Cyprus Chamber of Commerce and Industry.

Personal life 
Chrysostomides married lawyer Eleni G. Polyviou in 1974. They had two daughters, Daphne and Georgia.

Chrysostomides died on 1 December 2022, at the age of 80.

Publications 
Chrysostomides participated in and was the rapporteur and speaker at numerous international conferences, and a number of his articles were published in the Greek and foreign press. He was keenly interested in matters of international and constitutional law, human rights, and local government for which he has gained international recognition.

Professor Christopher Greenwood's introduction to “The Republic of Cyprus. A Study In International Law”, describes how Doctor Chrysostomides examines:

Chrysostomides' book Cyprus: Legal and Political Reflections, received praise for its depth and extensive analysis of the application of international law and ethics in Cyprus. Writing for the Cyprus Review, Stelios Perrakis described it as "an interesting source of information and arguments that serve as a basis for a global reflection on Cyprus and its future as a sovereign, independent, and undivided Republic."

Chrysostomides was also the author of two children’s stories namely, Ο Αρλεκίνος της Φεγγαρόπολης (2013) and Στο μικρό τους σπίτι στο μικρό τους χωριό (2021). Both have won critical acclaim and have been included in the syllabus of Cyprus public elementary schools. The Ministry of Education and Culture approved the book in an official letter dated 2 February 2022.

Human rights 
During the period 1969–1973 Kypros Chrysostomides worked with the European Commission of Human Rights of the Council of Europe in Strasbourg, France. During his term at the European Commission, he participated in the Commission’s investigation of the accusations against the Greek Junta for violations of human rights.

As a member of the legal secretariat of the European Commission which visited Athens and examined witnesses regarding the allegations against the Greek Junta, Dr. Chrysostomides participated in the team under one of the leaders of the investigation, Professor James Fawcett.

Doctor Chrysostomides conducted interviews of witnesses including politicians under house arrest and other civilians who suffered torture and degrading treatment at the hands of the Junta police. Various locations were visited by the team and police officers, who were suspected of carrying out acts of torture, were examined. Hearings took place at the Evgenideion Foundation Building.

Chrysostomides was one of the first lawyers to defend cases of refugees and other victims of the Turkish invasion before the European Court of Human Rights.

Honours 
 In 1991 during the presidency of François Mitterrand, he was honoured by the French government with the medal of the “Chevalier de l’Ordre National du Merite” (Ordre National du Merite) and then by the Government of Jacques Chirac in 2004 with the medal of “Officier de l’Ordre National du Merite".
 He was also honoured with the "Grand Cross of the Order of Phoenix" («Μεγαλόσταυρος του Τάγματος του Φοίνικα») by the then President of the Third Republic of Greece, Kostis Stephanopoulos.
 In November 2022, he was honoured with the "Lifetime Achievement Award" in the Cyprus Review Annual Book Awards (CRABA 2022) at the University of Nicosia, in recognition of his significant body of published work, especially on the international aspects of the Cyprus Question.

References

General references 
 1972 Yearbook of the European Convention on Human Rights (The Greek case, 1969), European Commission of Human Rights. Martinus Nijhof, The Hague, 1972.

Publications

English 
 Cyprus: Legal and Political Reflections, Nicosia 2021, Alfa Dimiourgiki and CIPREA Publications. 

 The Republic of Cyprus: A Study in International Law, Martinus Nijhof Publishers, Hague, Boston, London 2000, Kluwer Law International. Foreword by Christopher Greenwood, QC. 

 The Republic of Cyprus: A Study in International Law (Developments in International Law) by Chrysostomides, Kypros 

 Cyprus – The Way Forward, CIPREA Publications, Nicosia 2006.

Greek 
 Το Κράτος της Κύπρου στο Διεθνές Δίκαιο, Εκδόσεις Αντ. Ν. Σάκκουλα, Αθήνα. Εισαγωγή από τον Καθηγητή Εμμανουήλ Ρούκουνα. Foreword by Emmanouel Roukounas 

 Απόψεις, άρθρα, μελέτες  1990.

 Στο τέλος της αρχής (Πολιτικές παρεμβάσεις στην τροχιά του Κυπριακού), Εκδόσεις Καστανιώτη, Αθήνα 1997. 

 Υπεράσπιση της πολιτικής του αύριο (Κυπριακές πολιτικές συνέχειες), Εκδόσεις Καστανιώτη, Αθήνα 2001. 

 Διεκδίκηση Ενωμένης Πατρίδας (Κύπρος – πριν και μετά το Σχέδιο Ανάν), Εκδόσεις Καστανιώτη, 2η έκδοση, Αθήνα 2006. 

 Πολιτικές Διαδρομές, Εκδόσεις Έπαλξης , Λευκωσία 2008. 

 Ανοικτά ζητήματα (Κυπριακό – Ευρωπαϊκή Ένωση – ΑΟΖ –Τουρκία), Εκδόσεις Καστανιώτη , Αθήνα 2012. 

 Ανάλεκτα, Λευκωσία 2020, Εκδόσεις «Αλφα Δημιουργική» 

 Διεθνές Δίκαιο: Παραβίαση και Παρακμή – Το κράτος ανδρείκελο στην κατεχόμενη Κύπρο, Λευκωσία 2022, Εκδόσεις Ρίζες

Children's books 
 Στο μικρό τους σπίτι στο μικρό τους χωριό, 2021

 Ο Αρλεκίνος της Φεγγαρόπολης, 2013

Turkish 
 Κibris-Onumuzdeki Yol, CIPREA Publications, Nicosia 2006. 

1942 births
2022 deaths
National and Kapodistrian University of Athens alumni
20th-century Cypriot lawyers
Cypriot political writers
Greek Cypriot people
Leaders of political parties in Cyprus
Members of the House of Representatives (Cyprus)
Cyprus Ministers of Justice and Public Order
People from Nicosia
University of Bonn alumni
Progressive Party of Working People politicians
20th-century Cypriot writers
21st-century Cypriot writers
People from Paphos District
21st-century Cypriot lawyers